Ananta Vasudeva Temple ("Temple of the Infinite Vāsudeva", Odia:ଅନନ୍ତ ବାସୁଦେବ ମନ୍ଦିର) is a Hindu temple dedicated to Krishna, an avatar of Vishnu located in Bhubaneswar, the state capital of Odisha, India. The temple was constructed in the thirteenth century, and the complete murtis of Krishna, Balarama and Subhadra are worshipped there. The temple dates back to the period of Chandrika Devi, the daughter of Anangabhima III, during the reign of the king Bhanudeva. A commemorative inscription that marked the foundation of the temple can be found in the British Museum's collection.

Legend
It appears that the original image of Vishnu was worshipped on the spot where the great temple of Ananta Vasudeva was built in the 13th century A.D. Thus in the 13th century, Queen Chandrika of Eastern Ganga dynasty was prompted to construct a new temple - the temple of Ananta Vasudeva in this place. There must have been an old temple where this Vishnu image was installed. The Marathas, who extended their empire up to river Mahanadi, were responsible for renovating the Vishnu temple at Bhubaneswar in the late 17th Century.

Architecture
In form, the temple resembles the Lingaraj temple, but includes Vaishnavite (Vishnu related) sculptures. The temple has longitudinal bands of miniature shikharas (shrines), exactly like those in Lingaraj temple, with the minor difference that the number of the shikharas forming one longitudinal band in its case is only three. The sculpture in the exterior walls varies in character in each temple in Bhubaneswar. Most of the female sculptures in the temple walls are overly ornamented and lack originality

The sanctum has the icons of Krishna, Balarama, and Subhadra. Balarama stands under a seven-hooded serpent, Subhadra holds pot of jewels and a lotus in her two hands, keeping her left foot over another jewel pot, while Krishna holds a mace, chakra, lotus, and a conch.

Difference from Jagannath Temple, Puri
The idols found in the garbhagrha (sanctum sanctorum) of the temple have complete structure unlike the images of the Jagannath Temple, Puri. Here the shrimurtis (idols) are made of black granite stone, rather than wood, as seen in the Puri temple. For this temple only the city gains its name as Chakra kshetra (circular place), whereas Puri is named Shankha kshetra (conch-shaped place).

Gallery

References

Hindu temples in Bhubaneswar
Temples dedicated to Jagannath
Archaeological monuments in Odisha
13th-century Hindu temples
13th-century establishments in India